Bootleggers and Baptists is a concept put forth by regulatory economist Bruce Yandle, derived from the observation that regulations are supported both by groups that want the ostensible purpose of the regulation, and by groups that profit from undermining that purpose.

For much of the 20th century, Baptists and other evangelical Christians were prominent in political activism for Sunday closing laws restricting the sale of alcohol. Bootleggers sold alcohol illegally, and got more business if legal sales were restricted. Yandle wrote that "Such a coalition makes it easier for politicians to favor both groups. ... the Baptists lower the costs of favor-seeking for the bootleggers, because politicians can pose as being motivated purely by the public interest even while they promote the interests of well-funded businesses. ... [Baptists] take the moral high ground, while the bootleggers persuade the politicians quietly, behind closed doors."

Economic theory
The mainstream economic theory of regulation treats politicians and administrators as brokers among interest groups. Bootleggers and Baptists is a specific idea in the subfield of regulatory economics that attempts to predict which interest groups will succeed in obtaining rules they favor. It holds that coalitions of opposing interests that can agree on a common rule will be more successful than one-sided groups.

Baptists do not merely agitate for legislation, they help monitor and enforce it (a law against Sunday alcohol sales without significant public support would likely be ignored, or be evaded through bribery of enforcement officers). Thus bootleggers and Baptists is not just an academic restatement of the common political accusation that shadowy for-profit interests are hiding behind public-interest groups to fund deceptive legislation. It is a rational theory to explain relative success among types of coalitions.

Another part of the theory is that bootleggers and Baptists produce suboptimal legislation. Although both groups are satisfied with the outcome, broader society would be better off either with no legislation or different legislation. For example, a surtax on Sunday alcohol sales could reduce Sunday alcohol consumption as much as making it illegal. Instead of enriching bootleggers and imposing policing costs, the surtax could raise money to be spent on, say, property tax exemptions for churches and alcoholism treatment programs. Moreover, such a program could be balanced to reflect the religious beliefs and drinking habits of everyone, not just certain groups. From the religious point of the view, the bootleggers have not been cut out of the deal, the government has become the bootlegger.

Although the bootleggers and Baptists story has become a standard idea in regulatory economics, it has not been systematically validated as an empirical proposition. It is a catch-phrase useful in analyzing regulatory coalitions rather than an accepted principle of economics.

Literal examples

1) In 2015, liquor stores in the "wet counties" of Arkansas allied with local religious leaders to oppose statewide legalization of alcohol sales. Where the religious groups were opposed on moral grounds, the liquor stores were concerned over the potential loss of customers if rival stores were permitted to open in the "dry" counties of the state.

2) Willie Morris, the editor of Harper's Magazine in the 1960s, published a memoir of growing up in Mississippi. He wrote: 

3) In a 1952 speech by Noah S. "Soggy" Sweat, Jr., a young lawmaker from the U.S. state of Mississippi, on the subject of whether Mississippi should continue to prohibit (which it did until 1966) or finally legalize alcoholic beverages, Sweat said:

Other applications
Bootleggers and Baptists has been invoked to explain nearly every political alliance for regulation in the United States in the last 30 years including the Clean Air Act, interstate trucking, state liquor stores, the Pure Food and Drug Act, environmental policy, regulation of genetically modified organisms, the North American Free Trade Agreement, environmental politics, gambling legislation, blood donation, wine regulation, and the tobacco settlement.

Legislation and treaties to reduce global warming often command support of both polluting countries and environmentalists. Yandle and Buck argue that a similar phenomenon took place in the battle over the Kyoto Protocol, where the "Baptist" environmental groups provided moral support while "bootlegger" corporations and nations worked in the background to seek economic advantages over their rivals.

See also 

 Crony capitalism
 Moonshine
 Regulatory capture
 Rum-running

References

External links
  Pdf.
 Podcast. Yandle discusses the story with Russ Roberts at EconTalk.

Alcohol law in the United States

Regulation